The Young American Award is an award of the Boy Scouts of America for outstanding college students ages 19 through 25 who have achieved excellence in the fields of art, athletics, business, community service, education, government, humanities, literature, music, religion, and science; and have given service to their community, state, and/or country.

The award was presented at both the national and the local council levels, but the national program was discontinued in 2009 due to funding. A maximum of five national awards had been presented annually while local awards continue to be unlimited. Each local council made the determination for nominating its candidates for national competition.  Recipients of the national award also received a $7,500 cash award that was primarily funded by Learning for Life.  Membership in any of the BSA or Learning for life programs is not obligatory.

Award
The national award consisted of a silver medallion suspended from a red, white and blue ribbon worn around the neck.  The medallion bears the images of young man and a young woman above a wreath.  Local recipients receive a gold version of the medallion affixed to a wooden plaque.  Recipients may wear the corresponding square knot insignia, with a silver knot on a red, white and blue background, on the BSA uniform.

History
The award was first presented in 1954 by the United States Department of Justice as the Young American Award for Service and the Young American Award for Bravery.  Each of these awards were to be presented to two young people from each state and territory annually.  The Justice Department had trouble promoting the award and approached the BSA for assistance in 1966.

With the launch of coeducational Exploring in 1968, the BSA took on the role of soliciting and receiving nominations, and assumed the program in 1971.  The awards were originally available to youth ages 15 through 25; in 2005, it was changed to college students ages 19 through 25.

The original medals were suspended from neck ribbons, but the BSA soon changed them to a table medal, with the medallion placed in a block of acrylic glass.  The ribbon version of the medal was restored for the national award after the introduction of Venturing.

The square knot insignia is the same as was used for three former Exploring awards: the Explorer Silver Award, Exploring Achievement Award and the Exploring G.O.L.D. Award.  This knot may also be worn by those Scouting and Venturing leaders who have earned the predecessor awards.

National Recipients
From 1968 through 2008, there have been 188 recipients of the national award.

1968
 Greg Bamford, Colorado
 Anthony Watson, Illinois
 William Cobb, Nevada
 Ann Marie Kaminski, Nebraska
 Rick Sowash, Ohio

1969
 Michael Shearn, Texas
 Debra George, Wyoming
 Joseph Lundy, California
 Staff Sgt. Dwight H. Johnson, Michigan
 George Begay, Arizona

1970
 Rodney Earl Donaldson, Texas
 Paul Douglas Ring, Arizona
 John Parker Stewart, Colorado
 Rex Kern, Ohio
 Madeline Manning Jackson, Ohio
 Jennifer Sue Inskeep, Kansas

1971
 David Powell, Utah
 Craig R. Rudlin, Virginia
 Clayton Taylor, Oklahoma
 James Heath, New York
 Claudia Turner, South Carolina
 Virginia A. Stroud, Wyoming

1972
 Charles Ealey, Jr. Ohio
 Janet Lynne Nowicki, Illinois
 Suzonne Elizabeth Quave, Louisiana
 Larry Lee Shaw, Utah
 Larry Simpson, Tennessee

1973
 Rufus Washington, Jr., North Carolina
 Stephen Brady, Hawaii
 Robert Meldrum, Utah
 Larry Eisenberg, Illinois
 Judy Bochenski, Oregon
 Robert Charles Howe, Illinois

1974
 Roger Henry Brown, Jr., Georgia
 Kenneth Beale, Jr., Pennsylvania
 Aaron J. Jorgensen, Minnesota
 Darrel Owen Pace, Ohio

1975
 Graciela Trilla, New York
 Garth Cox, Ohio
 Ashby Boyle II, Utah
 Thomas Camp, Nebraska
 Stanley Roach, Oklahoma
 Stan Tenenbaum, New York

1976
 Fredrick McClure, Texas
 Nancy Ann Kraemer, New York
 Terri Sue Hannon, Kansas
 John L. Dardenne, Jr., Louisiana
 Mary Van Lear Wright, Massachusetts
 Bradley Haddock, Kansas
 Angela Lea Garner, Tennessee
 Eileen Devine, California
 John E. Hayashi, Missouri
 Gerald R. Castellianos, Florida
 Dorothy Hamill, Connecticut

1977
 Lee Zachary Maxey, Texas
 Mark Daniel Worrell, Pennsylvania
 David Gene McKenney, United States Air Force Academy
 Allen Matheson Hughes, Utah
 Douglas Leighton Bandow, California
 Richard David Thomas, Idaho
 Beth Susan Dochinger, Ohio
 Ruth Lydia Bonaparte, Oregon
 Robert Hoke Perkins, Jr.

1978
 Kathy Howard, Oklahoma
 William Grau, New Jersey
 Joseph Rabatin, Minnesota
 Kenneth Allen, Nebraska
 Mary Beth Caruso, Massachusetts
 Larry Kwak, Kansas

1979
 Steve Cauthen, Kentucky
 Catherine Lazaro, Texas
 Richard Preister, Nebraska
 Jill Sterkel, California
 Scott Trotter, Utah
 David Tulanian, California

1980
 Peggy Ann Hall, Iowa
 Robert J. Hayashi, Missouri
 Mark W. Leinmiller, Georgia
 Nancy Lieberman, New York
 Steadman Shealy, Alabama
 Kerry L. Sorenson, Utah

1981
 Karen L. Middleton, Wisconsin
 Jeffrie A. Herrmann, New York
 Jennifer L. Shaw, Connecticut
 Roger W. Slead, Missouri
 Davalu D. Smith, Texas
 Sherri L. Dalphonse, New Hampshire

1982
 John Ashley Null, Kansas
 Timothy Michael Delorey, Florida
 Vincent Arnold Lazaro, Texas
 Cynthia Ann Reeves, Oklahoma
 Karl Julius Edelmann, Michigan
 Anthony Deh-Chuen So, Delaware

1988
 Douglas C. Barnhart, Pennsylvania
 Ron Brooks, New Jersey
 Paul Gonzales, California
 Laura Hengehold, Ohio
 Anne V. Ingram, North Carolina

1990
 Peter Boyer, Rhode Island
 John M. Garrison, Texas
 Hugh Herr, Pennsylvania
 Vick Huber, Delaware
 Talia Melanie McCray, Colorado

1992
 Frank Bradish, Idaho
 Derek Y. Kunimoto, Hawaii
 Arthur J. Ochoa, Delaware
 Mark Smith, Oregon
 Trina R. Williams, Indiana

1993
 Tracy L. Collett, Georgia
 Marlon Harmon, Wisconsin
 Hung Pham, Colorado
 Michael E. Plochocki, New York
 Joseph E. Ponzo, Massachusetts

1994
 Harold Richard Davis, Jr., South Carolina
 Javier David Margo, Jr., Texas
 Lethuy Thi Nguyen, Oklahoma
 Jamel Oeser-Sweat, New York
 Roderick D. Tranum, Georgia

1995
 Kevin Michael Crozier, Colorado
 Renee Kylene Hamel, Oklahoma
 Preston Hopson, III, Michigan
 Robert Lester Murry, Massachusetts
 Phillip Charles Rodriguez III, California

1996
 David Quinn Gacioch, New York
 Joel Morales, Jr., Texas
 Nan-Phong Duy Phan, California
 Randolph Walker, Jr., Mississippi
 Julie Anne Waller, North Carolina

1997
 Robert Edward Hugh Ferguson, Jr., Utah
 Christopher Todd Fullerton, Georgia
 Yukitoshi Murasaki, Florida
 Matthew John Spence, California
 Sabrina Martinique Thompson, North Carolina

1998
 Amanda Gayle Cox, Georgia
 Kirk Cristman Fistick, Maryland
 G. Christopher Jones, Oklahoma
 Denise Yvette Margo, Texas
 Hayata Kristy Poonyagariyagorn, Oregon

1999
 Justin Daniel Guerra, Missouri
 Erica Camille Quick, North Carolina
 Sylvester George Tan, Georgia
 Michelle Irene Towle, Minnesota
 John J. van Velthuyzen, Washington

2000
 Julius Demarcus Jackson, Texas
 Carl Frederick Regelmann, New York
 Svati Singla, North Carolina
 Alison L. Smith, Minnesota
 Christopher Kirill Sokolov, California

2001
 James W. Johnson, Pennsylvania
 Jason Wayne Kemp, North Carolina
 Hong-Ly Thi La, Maryland
 Cyrus Jerrerson Lawayer IV, Maryland
 Evan Michael Todd, Colorado

2002
 Michael John Beckel, Minnesota
 Lindsey D. Cameron, Texas
 Christina Hsiung Chen, Texas
 Mark Alan Mallak, Florida
 Edward J. Walneck, Arizona

2003
 Kyle James Cline, Illinois
 Brett Michael Patrick Klukan, Pennsylvania
 Katherine Ann Knuth, Minnesota
 Akeem Rasheed Samuels, New Jersey
 Jonathan P. Wilkerson, Texas

2004
 Aaron Azur Allen, California
 Elizabeth Anne Beckel, Minnesota
 Evan Eugene Hunsberger, California
 James Steven Kleckner, Wisconsin
 Kevin Koo, New Hampshire

2005
 Robert Kyle Alderson, Oklahoma
 Aubyn Cathleen Burnside, South Carolina
 Christopher Alan Kerzich, Illinois
 Melanie Alise Perry, Missouri
 Michael David Sekora, Pennsylvania

2006
 Benjamin Jacob Ulrich Banwart, Minnesota
 Mark Christopher Bicket, Oklahoma
 Richard B. Birrer, New York
 Shreyans C. Parekh, California
 Phillip D. Stewart, Nevada

2007
 Fernando S. Arán Jr., Florida
 Daniel Cayce, Arkansas
 Michael Alexander Hayoun, New Jersey
 Michael Quang Nguyen, California
 Logan Mark Skelley,  Missouri

2008
 Paul Jacob Parker Banwart, Minnesota
 Gary Conard Bosshardt, Utah
 Welland Dane Burnside, South Carolina
 Sameer Gupta, Georgia
 Evan Jameson Spencer, Arizona

Per the national office national awards will no longer be given.

See also
 Awards and decorations of the United States government

References

Advancement and recognition in the Boy Scouts of America
Student awards
Awards and decorations of the United States Department of Justice